Liz Wardley (born 6 December 1979) is a Papua New Guinean sailor. who was watch captain for Team SCA in the 2014–15 Volvo Ocean Race.

Biography 
She lives in La Forêt-Fouesnant in Finistère, France, and has also lived in Sydney, Australia.

Honours 
She was named the Papua New Guinean Sportswomen of the Year in 1999 and 2000.
 1998 :  in the Hobbie Cat World Championships
 1999 :  in the Australian National Championships -  in the Sydney-Hobart PHS Div 2, on Elliot 36 ft ‘Phillip’s Foote’ 
 2001-2002 : Amer Sports Too Volvo Ocean Race
 2002 :  in the Overhand Open
 2004 :  in the Solitaire du Figaro -  in the Generali Solo
 2005 :  in the Solitaire du Figaro
 2006 :  in the Solitaire du Figaro -  in the Transat AG2R -  in the Solitaire de la Méditerranée
 2007 :  in the BPE Trophy 8th French long course Championships

References

External links 
 

1979 births
Living people
Papua New Guinean female sailors (sport)
Sportspeople from Finistère
Volvo Ocean Race sailors